Rose Bud School District is a public school district based in Rose Bud, Arkansas that provides comprehensive education to its students in western White County, south-central Cleburne County, and a small northeastern portion of Faulkner County.

It includes the unincorporated area of Romance.

The mascot and colors for the district and its two schools is the Ramblers in red and white.

Schools 
 Rose Bud High School—provides secondary education for grades 7–12.
 Rose Bud Elementary School—provides early childhood and elementary education for prekindergarten (PK) through 6.

References

External links 
 

Education in White County, Arkansas
Education in Cleburne County, Arkansas
Education in Faulkner County, Arkansas
School districts in Arkansas
1914 establishments in Arkansas
School districts established in 1914